The Italy women's national under-18 and under-19  is a national women's basketball team of Italy and is governed by the Italian Basketball Federation. 
It represents Italy in international under-19 and under-18 (under age 19 and under age 18) women's basketball competitions.

FIBA Under-19 Women's World Cup results

See also
Italy women's national basketball team
Italy women's national under-17 basketball team

References

U
Women's national under-19 basketball teams